In mathematics, a Rota–Baxter algebra is an associative algebra, together with a particular linear map R which satisfies the Rota–Baxter identity. It appeared first in the work of the American mathematician Glen E. Baxter  in the realm of probability theory. Baxter's work was further explored from different angles by Gian-Carlo Rota, Pierre Cartier, and Frederic V. Atkinson, among others. Baxter’s derivation of this identity that later bore his name emanated from some of the fundamental results of the famous probabilist Frank Spitzer in random walk theory.

In the 1980s, the Rota-Baxter operator of weight 0 in the context of Lie algebras was rediscovered as the operator form of the classical Yang–Baxter equation, named after the well-known physicists Chen-Ning Yang and Rodney Baxter.

The study of Rota–Baxter algebras experienced a renaissance this century, beginning with several developments, in the algebraic approach to renormalization of perturbative quantum field theory, dendriform algebras, associative analogue of the classical Yang–Baxter equation and mixable shuffle product constructions.

Definition and first properties
Let k be a commutative ring and let  be given. A linear operator R on a k-algebra A is called a Rota–Baxter operator of weight  if it satisfies the Rota–Baxter relation of weight :

for all . Then the pair  or simply A is called a Rota–Baxter algebra of weight . In some literature,  is used in which case the above equation becomes

called the Rota-Baxter equation of weight . The terms Baxter operator algebra and Baxter algebra are also used.

Let  be a Rota–Baxter of weight . Then  is also a Rota–Baxter operator of weight .

Examples
Integration by parts

Integration by parts is an example of a Rota–Baxter algebra of weight 0.  Let  be the algebra of continuous functions from the real line to the real line. Let : be a continuous function. Define integration as the Rota–Baxter operator

Let G(x) = I(g)(x) and F(x) = I(f)(x). Then the formula for integration for parts can be written in terms of these variables as

In other words

which shows that I is a Rota–Baxter algebra of weight 0.

Spitzer identity
The Spitzer identity appeared is named after the American mathematician Frank Spitzer. It is regarded as a remarkable 
stepping stone in the theory of sums of independent random variables in fluctuation theory of probability. It can naturally be understood in terms of Rota–Baxter operators.

Bohnenblust–Spitzer identity

Notes

External links
 Li Guo. WHAT IS...a Rota-Baxter Algebra? Notices of the AMS, December 2009, Volume 56 Issue 11

Algebras
Combinatorics